Flügel, Flugel or Fluegel (which means wing in German) may refer to:

People 
listed alphabetically by first name
 Barbara Flügel, contemporary German artist
 Darlanne Fluegel (1958–2017), American model and actress
 Ernst Flügel (1844–1912), German Romantic composer
 Ewald Flügel (1863–1914), German-American professor at Stanford University
 Gustav Leberecht Flügel (1802–1870), German orientalist
 Johann Gottfried Flügel (1788–1855), German lexicographer
 John Flügel (1884–1955), British experimental psychologist
 Julian Flügel (born 1986), German long-distance runner
 Otto Flügel (1842–1914), German philosopher and theologian

Music 
 Flugel, the "wing" or tenor joint of the bassoon
 Flugel, short for the flugelhorn
 Name for the harpsichord in the 18th and early 19th centuries
 Name for the pianoforte in the late 19th century
 "Weiß Flügel", a 2008 single by Yousei Teikoku

Other 
 Der Flügel, a far-right faction within the political party Alternative for Germany 
 Yokohama Flügels, a defunct Japanese football (soccer) club

See also

German-language surnames